Konaklı may refer to:
 
 Konaklı, Antalya
 Konaklı, Arhavi
 Konaklı, Ardanuç
 Konaklı, Bozdoğan
 
 Konaklı, Çermik
 Konaklı, Çorum
 Konaklı, Dörtyol
 Konaklı, Düzce
 
 Konaklı, İzmir
 Konaklı, Kozluk
 Konaklı, Kumru
 
 Konaklı, Niğde, the Turkish name for Misthi, Cappadocia